Bauersche Gießerei was a German type foundry founded in 1837 by Johann Christian Bauer in Frankfurt am Main. Noted typeface designers, among them Lucian Bernhard, Konrad Friedrich Bauer (not related to the company's founder), Walter Baum, Heinrich Jost, Imre Reiner, Friedrich Hermann Ernst Schneidler, Emil Rudolf Weiß, and Heinrich Wienyck, designed typefaces for the company.

The company nearly went bankrupt at the end of the 19th century because the company's administration assumed that type founding, rather than typesetting, would be automated. The new owner, Georg Hartmann, succeeded in saving the company. Subsequently, the company grew, also due to several takeovers, e.g. in 1916 by Frankfurt's type foundry Flinsch, itself a global player. In 1927, an office was opened in New York City.

In 1972, all activities of the headquarters in Frankfurt were reportedly ceased and transferred to the former subsidiary company, Fundición Tipográfica Neufville in Barcelona, after 1995 to Bauer Types, SL, which still owns the rights to many typefaces. These are distributed by companies like Monotype, Adobe, Paratype, URW++, Elsner & Flake, as well as Neufville Digital for the typeface Futura ND.

Typefaces
The following foundry types were issued by Bauer:

References
In German
 Konrad F. Bauer: Zur Geschichte der Unger-Fraktur. Sonderabzug aus dem Gutenberg-Jahrbuch, 1929. Bauersche Gießerei, Frankfurt a. M.
 Eberhard Hölscher: Ansprache bei der Eröffnung der Ausstellung „Der Schriftkünstler E. R. Weiß“, anlässlich seines sechzigsten Geburtstages, im Schriftmuseum Rudolf Blanckertz in Berlin, 1935. Bauersche Gießerei, Frankfurt a. M.
 Greif, eine Geschichte des Buchdrucker-Wappentieres, 1939. Bauersche Gießerei, Frankfurt a. M.
 Ein Stammbaum der Schrift, 1962. Bauersche Gießerei, Frankfurt a. M.

External links 
 Publications regarding the Bauer Type Foundry in the catalogue of the German National Library (in German)
 Short information at Linotype.com
 Short information at Myfonts.com

Letterpress font foundries of Germany
Manufacturing companies based in Frankfurt